"The Colour of My Love" is a song written by Paul Ryan. Two artists first released it as a single on the same day, 14 March 1969. A version by Jefferson became a top-30 hit in the UK as well as charting in the UK. The other, by Billy J. Kramer, was only released in the UK and failed to chart. Paul Ryan's brother Barry also recorded a version that was released as a single in several countries.

Jefferson version

Release
After leaving beat group the Rockin' Berries in 1968, Geoff Turton began a solo career under the pseudonym Jefferson. His first release, "Montage", failed to chart, but it was the follow-up "The Colour of My Love" that saw him first enter the charts as a solo artist. However, composer Paul Ryan was not impressed with Jefferson's version, saying "quite frankly, I think it's a load of rubbish. The production is terrible. Jefferson's a nice bloke, but it's very upsetting to hear what someone has done to your song. It's like someone framing a picture you're proud of in a tatty frame".

Track listing
 "The Colour of My Love" – 2:32
 "Look No Further" – 2:35

Charts

Barry Ryan version

Release
Capitalising on the success of Barry Ryan's previous two singles "Eloise" and "Love Is Love" which were particularly successful in Europe, MGM released "The Colour of My Love" as a follow-up single from the album Barry Ryan Sings Paul Ryan. It was released in continental Europe, Scandinavia, South Africa and Rhodesia (Zimbabwe) with the B-side "My Mama", also written by Paul Ryan.

Track listing
 "The Colour of My Love" – 2:46
 "My Mama" – 3:46

Charts

Other versions
 In late 1969, Danish singer Bjørn Tidmand released a Danish-language version titled "Et billed af min kærlighed" as a single which peaked at number 15 on the IFPI Danmark chart.
 In 1970, French singer Dalida released a French-language version titled "Les couleurs de l'amour" as a single.

References

1969 singles
1969 songs
Pye Records singles
MGM Records singles
Song recordings produced by John Schroeder (musician)
Songs written by Paul Ryan (singer)